"New Car Smell" is the fourth episode of the second season of the American television drama series Homeland, and the 16th episode overall. It originally aired on Showtime on October 21, 2012.

Plot 
Saul (Mandy Patinkin) shows the video of Brody's confession to Estes (David Harewood). Saul and Estes agree to spy on Brody (Damian Lewis) for the time being, in hopes of getting information on what al-Qaeda is plotting. They do not tell anyone else in the CIA, other than analyst Peter Quinn (Rupert Friend), who is in charge of the operation at Estes's insistence. Cameras are set up to watch Brody at the Rayburn House Office Building and his phones are tapped. Virgil (David Marciano) and Max (Maury Sterling) are tasked with following Brody when he is outside of the surveillance areas. Carrie and Quinn clash at first; Carrie is surprised that an analyst that she had never even met is running things.

Brody attempts to apologize to Jessica (Morena Baccarin) for his actions but Jessica demands an explanation. Brody says he wants to tell her, but he cannot. Jessica gives him an ultimatum: tell her "something true" about what he has been up to, or sleep somewhere else. Brody just walks away. Quinn's team is able to get a feed to the security cameras at the Ashford Hotel where Brody ends up staying.

Quinn asks Carrie to run into Brody to make him paranoid and hopefully compel him to contact his handler. Carrie meets a surprised Brody outside of Langley. She hints that she is back with the CIA in some capacity. Brody is spooked after the encounter. He speaks with Roya Hammad (Zuleikha Robinson), and tells her that Carrie is back with the CIA and that it must have something to do with him. Roya is not so sure, suggesting that Carrie may have just been brought back in to pursue Abu Nazir.  
 
Lauder (Marc Menchaca) shows up at the Brodys' house ranting about Brody and refusing to leave until Brody gets home. Jessica, wanting to get him out of the house, calls Brody, who does not answer. When Brody finally calls back an hour later, Jessica angrily tells him that she needed him an hour ago, and that Mike (Diego Klattenhoff) is helping her out instead. Mike drives Lauder home and they discuss Brody. Both agree that Brody is clearly no longer the same guy since he came back. They speculate that Brody and Walker were always a team, and may have been working together for someone, possibly the CIA, on the day Walker shot Elizabeth Gaines.

As he shows her some of the "perks" of being the Vice President's son, Finn (Timothée Chalamet) takes Dana (Morgan Saylor) inside the Washington Monument while it is closed for renovations. While they admire the view of DC, Dana and Finn start to kiss, but Dana cuts it short, saying she needs to talk to Xander before going any further. 
    
Brody, in the bar of the hotel, calls Carrie and invites her to have a drink and "bury the hatchet." Encouraged by Quinn, Carrie goes to the bar, and they have a pleasant conversation. Brody admits that he is on the outs with his wife. They discuss Carrie's road to recovery and about how she is now hot on the trail of Abu Nazir. They part ways, and Saul and Quinn congratulate Carrie on a job well done. However, Carrie is dissatisfied, certain that Brody is on to her due to a brief moment of anger she showed in the conversation. Quinn disagrees, and orders Carrie to come back to headquarters. Carrie instead goes up to Brody's hotel room. She immediately blows her cover, proudly telling Brody she knows who he is, running down everything he is guilty of, and finally calling him a traitor and a terrorist. Quinn and Saul, watching in disbelief, immediately dispatch their men to apprehend Brody. Seemingly about to hurt her, Brody tells Carrie that he actually liked her to which she replies "I loved you," leaving him stunned, just before Saul's team enters the room and arrests Brody. Carrie struggles to hold back tears as she watches Brody get taken away.

Production 
The episode was written by executive producer Meredith Stiehm, and was directed by David Semel.

Reception

Ratings
The original American broadcast received 1.75 million viewers, which increased in viewership and became the highest rated episode up to that point.

Critical response
The A.V. Club's Emily VanDerWerff gave the episode an "A−" on the strength of the scenes with Carrie and Brody together, saying "I didn’t realize how much I had missed watching Brody and Carrie bounce off of each other," and "something about the chemistry between Claire Danes and Damian Lewis heightens every scene they’re in."

Michael Hogan of The Huffington Post praised Homeland's ability to stay way ahead of viewer expectations and not leave plotlines hanging endlessly. Hogan mentioned the chemistry between Carrie and Brody as well as between Dana and Finn as being noteworthy.

Andy Greenwald of Grantland.com described the plot developments as "thrilling," and also "risky," in that "The central dance between Carrie and Brody, her struggle to bring his dark secret out into the light: This defined Homeland, it was the addictive engine that motored the show from pay-cable obscurity to the Emmy stage. To remove it — or, more likely, to reconsider it — now puts Homeland’s popularity and momentum in jeopardy."

IGN's Scott Collura highly praised the episode, rating it a 9.3 out of 10, citing the interplay between the two leads as a particular high point.  Collura enjoyed the new character, Peter Quinn, saying he "brings a refreshing dose of humor to the show."

Entertainment Weekly ranked "New Car Smell" as their second best overall television episode in 2012.

References

External links 
 "New Car Smell" at Showtime
 

2012 American television episodes
Homeland (season 2) episodes